Choerophryne gunnari is a species of frog in the family Microhylidae. It is endemic to Papua New Guinea and is known from the area of its type locality in the Central Province, and from the western slopes of Mount Obree, also in the Central Province.

Etymology
This species was originally described in the genus Albericus, named for Alberich, the dwarf in Scandinavian mythology and Richard Wagner's opera cycle Der Ring des Nibelungen. Menzies named the species he described after Alberich's companions in the mythodology. The specific name gunnari is derived from Gunnar.

Description
Ten individuals in the type series measure  in snout–urostyle length. The dorsal surface has a large, dark hour-glass mark on a greyish background. The ventral ground colour is whitish, but the throat is dark in both males and females. The belly has a large, dark, intense blue blotch, and hind limbs are marked with blue blotches alternating between lighter and darker shades. This blue pigmentation is unique among all former Albericus species known at the time.

The male advertisement call is said to lack "musical quality". It is a series of "clicks" emitted at a mean rate of 240 min1.

Habitat and conservation
Choerophryne gunnari is a poorly known species. It can be quite common in undisturbed habitat but does not seem to tolerate habitat modification. Logging is a threat to its habitat, although there should still be plenty of suitable habitat available.

References

gunnari
Amphibians of Papua New Guinea
Endemic fauna of Papua New Guinea
Amphibians described in 1999
Taxonomy articles created by Polbot